William Kingita Te Pohe Bush  (born 24 January 1949) is a former New Zealand rugby union player. A prop, Bush represented Canterbury at a provincial level, and was a member of the New Zealand national side, the All Blacks, from 1974 to 1979. He played 37 matches for the All Blacks including 12 internationals. He also represented, coached and selected for Māori All Blacks.

In the 1996 Queen's Birthday Honours, Bush was appointed a Member of the New Zealand Order of Merit, for services to rugby. In 2021 he was made a life member of New Zealand Māori Rugby Board.

In October 2022 Bush was engaged to be the bus driver for the All Black squad.

References

1949 births
Living people
Rugby union players from Napier, New Zealand
People educated at Whakatane High School
New Zealand rugby union players
New Zealand international rugby union players
Canterbury rugby union players
Māori All Blacks players
Rugby union props
Members of the New Zealand Order of Merit